Alattyán is a village in Jász-Nagykun-Szolnok county, in the Northern Great Plain region of central Hungary.

Famous people from Alattyán

On 15 May 2007, The New York Times published an article about looking for the ancestral estate of French president Nicolas Sarkozy's family in Alattyán.

Nowadays, for the elder inhabitants of Alattyán, Nicolas Sarkozy, nagybócsai Sárközy Miklós in Hungarian, is still considered their lord.

References

External links
 Official site in Hungarian

Populated places in Jász-Nagykun-Szolnok County
Jászság